A house monastery, family monastery or dynastic monastery is a Christian monastery that has a particular relationship with a noble family. 

Often, but not always, what subsequently became the house monastery was founded by the noble family in question. In each case, the family would grant the monastery estates, provide financial support or make other bequests. In doing so they also ensured that family members might be buried and commemorated there. Frequently the chronicles of the abbey would record the donations of the family, but also their histories in general.

Examples of house monasteries include:
 Merovingians: 
 Basilica of St Denis
 Robertians:
 Lorsch Abbey
 Carolingians: 
 Prüm Abbey
  Abbey of St. Medard
 Salians:
 Abbey of Echternach
 Liudolfinger, Ottonians: 
 Reichenau Abbey
 Gandersheim Abbey
 Quedlinburg Abbey 
 Essen Abbey
 Mauritius Abbey
 Neuenheerse
 Ascanians: 
 Lehnin Abbey
 Hohenstaufens: 
 Adelberg Abbey
 Lorch Abbey
 Welfs:
 Weingarten Abbey
 Habsburgs:
 Murbach Abbey
 Ottmarsheim Abbey Church
 Muri Abbey
 Königsfelden
 Ezzonids:
 Brauweiler Abbey
 House of Zähringen:
 Abbey of Saint Peter in the Black Forest (from 1093)
 House of Württemberg:
 Stiftskirche, Stuttgart (since 1321)
 House of Baden: 
 Lichtenthal Abbey in Baden-Baden (1288–1372),
 Stiftskirche in Baden-Baden (Line of Baden-Baden), 
 Stiftskirche of St. Michael in Pforzheim (line of Baden-Durlach, from 1535), 
 Evangelical Church in Karlsruhe (grand dukes, from 1807)
 House of Wittelsbach (Palatine line):
 Stiftskirche in Neustadt a.d. Weinstraße (14th century), 
 Church of the Holy Spirit, Heidelberg (15th–17th century)
 House of Wittelsbach (Old Bavarian line): 
 Scheyern Abbey,
 Theatine Church, Munich (from 1663)
 Upper Swabian nobility (Fugger, Waldburg, Montford, Gundelfingen), Tyrol, Alsace and Austrian hereditary lands of Carinthia and Bohemia
 Buchau Abbey
 Babonians:
 Walderbach Abbey

Christian monasticism
Noble families